Clare Duwelius (born April 18, 1989) is an American basketball executive who is the General Manager of the Minnesota Lynx of the Women's National Basketball Association (WNBA). Duwelius started with the Lynx in 2014 as the Basketball Operations Coordinator prior to being elevated to Basketball Operations Manager in 2016 and later Assistant General Manager in 2018.

Early life
Duwelius was raised in Des Moines, Iowa. She attended Dowling Catholic High School while growing up and then went to Wayne State College in Wayne, Nebraska to play basketball. She hit a game-winning three-pointer during the Northern Sun Intercollegiate Conference tournament to help lead the Wildcats to the conference title.
Duwelius concluded her career at WSC as the program’s all-time leader in 3-point field goals made (252) and was named first team All-NSIC in 2012, helping lead Wayne State to the NCAA Elite Eight. She was also named the 2008-2009 NSIC Freshman of the Year.

Following her playing career, Duwelius went on to become a graduate assistant coach at Southwest Minnesota State University in Marshall, Minnesota. While working on her master's degree at SMSU, Duwelius assisted in all operations of the women's basketball program, such as practice planning, facility preparation, equipment managing, team travel and video exchange.

Executive career

Minnesota Lynx
Duwelius began her career in the WNBA as the Basketball Operations coordinator with the Minnesota Lynx in 2014. She had been promoted to Assistant General Manager in 2018. After spending the last five years in that role, in December 2022, the Lynx announced Duwelius as their new General Manager, the fourth overall in franchise history.

See also
Minnesota Lynx

References

Living people
Basketball players from Iowa
Women's National Basketball Association general managers
Minnesota Lynx executives
Sportspeople from Des Moines, Iowa
Women's National Basketball Association executives
1989 births